Hemitriakis is a genus of houndsharks in the family Triakidae.

Species
 Hemitriakis abdita Compagno & Stevens, 1993 (deepwater sicklefin houndshark)
 Hemitriakis complicofasciata T. Takahashi & Nakaya, 2004 (ocellate topeshark)
 Hemitriakis falcata Compagno & Stevens, 1993 (sicklefin houndshark)
 Hemitriakis indroyonoi W. T. White, Compagno & Dharmadi, 2009 (Indonesian houndshark)
 Hemitriakis japanica (J. P. Müller & Henle, 1839) (Japanese topeshark)
 Hemitriakis leucoperiptera Herre, 1923 (whitefin topeshark)

References

 
 Compagno, Dando, & Fowler, Sharks of the World, Princeton University Press, New Jersey 2005 

 
Shark genera
Taxa named by Albert William Herre